Michael Donnellan (born 28 February 1977) is an Irish former Gaelic footballer who played at senior level for the Galway county team. He is the son of former politician and footballer, John Donnellan and grandson of politician and footballer Michael Donnellan. All of them captained the Galway football team in their careers.

Gaelic football career
Donnellan first came to prominence as a member of the talented St Jarlath's College in Tuam team of the early nineties. He played a crucial role in their Hogan Cup winning season of 1994, alongside future Galway team-mates Declan Meehan, Tomás Meehan, John Divilly, Tommy Joyce and  Pádraic Joyce. They reached the Connacht final the following year but lost out to their biggest rivals, St. Patrick's College, Tuam. He would later once more star alongside Joyce with the Tralee IT team that won the 1998 Sigerson Cup.

In 1998, Donnellan won his first All-Ireland medal, as part of the Galway side that won the All-Ireland Senior Football Championship in 1998. During the first half of the final against Kildare, Donnellan picked up the ball inside the heart of his own defence and proceeded to go on an amazing run, soloing the length of the field while exchanging a one-two with Kevin Walsh in the midfield. As he approached the Kildare goal, he laid the ball off to Derek Savage who passed to Sean Óg De Paor. De Paor slotted the ball over the bar. The score re-invigorated the Galway team, who were losing at the time. Donnellan's overall performance inspired Galway to their first football title in 32 years and completed a unique hat-trick of senior All-Ireland medals for his family, as he followed in the footsteps of his father John (1966) and his grandfather Mick (1925). The final score was 1–14 to 1–10. That solo run was later voted No.1 in the Top 20 GAA Moments, in 2003. He was named Texaco Footballer of the Year that year.

After reaching another final in 2000, losing out to Kerry after a replay, Donnellan & Galway returned to win the All-Ireland Senior Football Championship. After losing to Roscommon in the Connacht semi-final, Galway entered the newly introduced back-door qualifiers and defeated Wicklow, Armagh and Cork to reach the quarter-finals. They gained revenge over Roscommon with 0–14 to 1–05 victory to reach the semi-finals, where they defeated Derry by 3 points. In the final, they outclassed a Meath team by 0–17 to 0–08.

Donnellan went on to win an All-Ireland Senior Club Football Championship with his adopted club Salthill-Knocknacarra in 2005. He gave a man of the match performance in the final where Salthill narrowly edged out Antrim club St Gall's.

After being hampered by injury in recent years, Donnellan pulled the curtain down on a career at the end of the 2006 season, a career during which he won nearly ever honour in the game.

In May 2020, the Irish Independent named Donnellan as one of the "dozens of brilliant players" who narrowly missed selection for its "Top 20 footballers in Ireland over the past 50 years".

Soccer career
In December 1999, Donnellan signed for Don O'Riordan at Galway United for the rest of the 1999–2000 League of Ireland season. According to the Irish Independent, he could play "in midfield or in attack".

References

External links
 Donnellan Retires

1977 births
Living people
All Stars Awards winners (football)
All Stars Young Footballers of the Year
Michael
Dunmore McHales Gaelic footballers
Gaelic footballers who switched code
Galway inter-county Gaelic footballers
Irish international rules football players
People educated at St Jarlath's College
Salthill-Knocknacarra Gaelic footballers
Texaco Footballers of the Year
Winners of two All-Ireland medals (Gaelic football)
Republic of Ireland association footballers
Association football midfielders
Association football forwards
League of Ireland players
Galway United F.C. (1937–2011) players